William T. Harrington (September 29, 1925 in Lynn, Massachusetts – February 14, 1998 in Boston, Massachusetts), as Bill Harrington was an American sportscaster, children's television host, and news reporter for WHDH radio and WCVB-TV in Boston.

Sportscasting
Harrington was a sportscaster at WHDH radio during the 1960s. He was Johnny Most's color commentator on Boston Celtics games and the radio play-by-play announcer for the Boston Bruins 1963–1966.

Children's television
In 1960, Harrington was hired by WHDH-TV to play Commander Jet on Commander Jet's Comedy. He also played Nozo the Clown, the brother of Bozo the Clown. Nozo was used to fill in for Bozo when Frank Avruch was unable to appear on the show.

In 1956, he married fellow Boston television personality Jean Dallaire,   who subsequently played "Miss Jean" on the Boston version of Romper Room.  He later married journalist Helen Woodman who was the owner/editor of the State House News Service in Boston, Massachusetts.

News reporting
He worked as a news reporter and state house correspondent for WHDH radio, WHDH-TV and WCVB-TV during the 1960s, 1970s, and 1980s. He left reporting to become a media consultant.

References

1925 births
1998 deaths
American radio sports announcers
American television personalities
Male television personalities
Boston Bruins announcers
National Basketball Association broadcasters
National Hockey League broadcasters
People from Lynn, Massachusetts
Radio personalities from Boston